Jeffrey Juris (1971 – June 18, 2020) was an American professor who taught anthropology at Northeastern University. Juris received a Ph.D. in anthropology from UC Berkeley. Beyond being an educator, Juris was an author, political activist, and researcher. Juris specializes in social movements, transnational networks, new media activism, and political protests. He had a number of published books and maintained his own website, where he updated his  publications and political activism. Juris was cited and referenced many times for his research on the Occupy movement and other anti-globalization movements.

Political activity 

Juris was involved with the Boston Occupy on Dewey Square, both as a protester and as an academic observer. Juris recalled seeing a large rowdy young crowd of protesters walking the streets and chanting things like 'We are the 99%' and even encouraging bystanders by calling them the 99%. He also recalled seeing police brutality against peaceful veterans who were part of the occupy movement, similar to the violence that followed the disencampment of Occupy Wall Street. In his article, "Reflections on #Occupy Everywhere", Juris asserted that websites and listservs were a big part of the inception of Occupy, but the movement took a turn towards a more decentralized, social media led organization. He believed this was for the best as their online presence allows for the movement to maintain some sort of media influence. Juris noted that social media outlets, such as Facebook and Twitter, were an important part of organizing movements at the initial stages, but have since slowed their presence on internet platforms. Juris also noted that the modeling of the movement was based on the structure of social media. It was no longer about getting people to join the movement, but rather to bring as many groups of people together for their unique agenda. Juris argued that new radical democracy did not depend on a consensus among everyone, but rather a respect for other people's point of view. He held the new social media platforms' call for new types of political, social, and economic organizations. Juris had been working on a new project that explored the topic of pirate radio in Mexico City and beyond. This was to be based on his 15 months of research both academically and in the field.

Works 

Juris was the author of Networking Futures: the Movements Against Corporate Globalization, co-author of Global Democracy and the World Social Forums, co-editor of Insurgent Encounters: Transnational Activism, Ethnography, and the Political, and written many more articles on related topics.

His last and most popular work was Networking Futures, which used extensive ethnographic research into the Barcelona-based Movement for Global Resistance.  Along with his first-hand experience, interviews with key actors, social media networking, and involvement in organizing protests, Jeffrey  formulated theories and proposals on why these movements have been successful.

Juris and other OWS activists created a website called Occupy Research that allows researchers to share tools and data sets for the Occupy Movement. The website was taken down for lack of activity, but Juris maintained the records.

References

External links
 

1971 births
2020 deaths
American anthropologists
Northwestern University alumni
University of California, Berkeley alumni